The NCAA Division II women's basketball tournament (officially styled as "Championship" instead of "Tournament") is an annual tournament to determine the National Collegiate Athletic Association (NCAA) Division II women's college basketball national champion. Basketball was one of 12 women's sports added to the NCAA championship program for the 1981–82 school year, as the NCAA and Association for Intercollegiate Athletics for Women (AIAW) sought for sole governance of women's collegiate athletics. The AIAW continued to conduct its established championships; however, after a year of dual women's championships at the national level, the AIAW disbanded.

The 2020 Elite Eight was due to be held at the Birmingham CrossPlex in Birmingham, AL before the NCAA called off the tournament due to the COVID-19 outbreak.

The next year saw the field reduced to 48, but will return to 64 in 2022 & hereafter.

Glenville State are the defending national champions.

Qualification
A total of 64 bids are normally available for each tournament: 23 automatic bids (awarded to the champion of each Division II all-sports conference) and 41 at-large bids. Due to COVID-19 issues, the 2020 tournament was canceled, and the 2021 tournament was reduced to 48 teams when nine all-sports conferences chose not to compete in women's basketball in 2020–21.

The bids are allocated evenly among the eight NCAA-designated regions (Atlantic, Central, East, Midwest, South, South Central, Southeast, and West), each of which contains either two or three of the 23 Division II conferences that sponsor women's basketball. Each region normally consists of two or three automatic qualifiers (the teams who won their respective conference tournaments) and five or six at-large bids (awarded regardless of conference affiliation).

Conference tournaments

Results

Statistics

Championships by school

See also
 NCAA Division II men's basketball tournament
 NCAA Division I women's basketball tournament
 NCAA Division III women's basketball tournament
 NAIA Division I Women's Basketball Championship
 NAIA Division II Women's Basketball Championship

Notes

References

External links
 Attendance history (Archived)
 Division II Women's Basketball Championships Records Books (Through 2019) (Archived)

 
NCAA